"Shesmovedon" (pronounced as "She's Moved On") is a single by British progressive rock band Porcupine Tree, released in July 2000, from the Lightbulb Sun album. It came in three forms: a regular CD, a limited-version CD (2,000 copies) and a 7" vinyl (1,000 copies). The single reached #4 in the NME independent chart in its first week of release.

Track listing (regular CD)
"Shesmovedon" (Edit) – 3:50
"Cure for Optimism" – 6:13
"Untitled" – 8:52

Track listing (limited CD)
"Shesmovedon" (Album Version) – 5:19
"Russia on Ice" (Demo Version) – 13:10

Track listing (7" vinyl)
A/ "Shesmovedon" (Edit) – 3:50
B/ "Novak" – 3:50

Personnel
All tracks written by Steven Wilson, except "Untitled" and "Russia on Ice" written by Barbieri, Edwin, Maitland and Wilson.

Although the first track on the limited edition CD is labeled "album version", it differs slightly from that version, as on the album the track segues into the next song "Last Chance To Evacuate Planet Earth Before It Is Recycled" while on the single it has a clean ending.

Deadwing version

The song was re-recorded in the studio by the then-current lineup during the Deadwing album sessions. Mikael Åkerfeldt of the band Opeth performed harmony vocals on that version. It was released as a bonus track on the American version of Deadwing.

References

2000 singles
Porcupine Tree songs
2000 songs
Songs written by Steven Wilson